The 1985 Asia Golf Circuit was the 24th season of golf tournaments that comprised the Asia Golf Circuit.

Chen Tze-ming claimed the overall circuit title.

Tournament schedule
The table below shows the 1985 Asian Golf Circuit schedule. Due to economic turmoil in the Philippines, the Philippine Open was dropped from the circuit in 1984, and continued as a non-circuit event in 1985.

Final standings
The Asia Golf Circuit operated a points based system to determine the overall circuit champion, with points being awarded in each tournament to the leading players. At the end of the season, the player with the most points was declared the circuit champion, and there was a prize pool to be shared between the top players in the points table.

References

Asia Golf Circuit
Asia Golf Circuit